Kahurangi National Park in the northwest of the South Island of New Zealand is the second largest of the thirteen national parks of New Zealand. Much of what was the North-west Nelson Forest Park formed the basis of the new park. Kahurangi Point, regarded as the boundary between the West Coast and Tasman Regions, is located in the park, as is Mount Owen. The main tramping tracks in the park are the Heaphy Track and the Wangapeka Track.

The park is administered by the Department of Conservation. Tramping, rafting and caving are popular activities in the park. After being prohibited for several years, mountainbiking was allowed on the Heaphy Track on a trial basis for the winters of 2011, 2012 and 2013. The effect of the cyclists on trampers and the wildlife were to determine whether the trial continued or not.

Endangered takahē were reintroduced to the park in 2018, which was 100 years after they became extinct there. Eighteen takahē were released in Gouland Downs. The population has since grown to 31.

In 2019, it was announced that large parts of the Mōkihinui River catchment, including 15 km of riverbed, would be added to Kahurangi National Park. Opacuincola gretathunbergae, a species of freshwater snail that was discovered in the park, was named after the activist Greta Thunberg.

Conservation initiatives
In addition to ongoing conservation work by the Department of Conservation, there is a community initiative that aims "to implement, in partnership with the Department of Conservation, a conservation strategy to bring about the protection and/or return of endangered and threatened flora and fauna to the Flora Stream catchment area in Kahurangi National Park. This will enhance the experience for all visitors to this popular area, resulting in wider community appreciation and use of the Park."

The society now has approximately 30 kilometres of trap lines, with all traps at 100 metre spacing. A wasp eradication programme is in place, and bird monitoring is also part of the society's programme.

See also
Conservation parks of New Zealand
Forest parks of New Zealand
Regional parks of New Zealand
Protected areas of New Zealand
Conservation in New Zealand
Biodiversity of New Zealand
Tramping in New Zealand

References

External links

 Kahurangi National Park – Department of Conservation information

 
Buller District
Protected areas of the West Coast, New Zealand
Protected areas of the Tasman District
Protected areas established in 1996
Golden Bay